The Mid-Eastern Wrestling Federation (MEWF) Heavyweight Championship is the highest ranking singles title in the Mid-Eastern Wrestling Federation, one of three in the promotion.

The title was created when Ricky Blues defeated Agent Orange at an event held in Odenton, Maryland on January 18, 1992. In 2003, the title was merged with the MCW Heavyweight Championship when Maryland Championship Wrestling held its final show as an interpromtional event with the Mid-Eastern Wrestling Federation creating the Mid-Eastern Wrestling Federation Unified Heavyweight Championship on July 16, 2003.

The championship has been known as:
MEWF Heavyweight Championship (1991–2003)
MEWF Unified Heavyweight Championship (2003–2004)

The heavyweight title was later revived after Maryland Championship Wrestling began promoting events in the Maryland-area in 2007.

There have been a total of 30 recognized champions who have had a combined 45 official reigns.

Title history

References

External links
Official Heavyweight Championship Title History
MEWF Heavyweight Championship history at Solie.org

Heavyweight wrestling championships